Cheryl Dunye (born May 13, 1966) is a Liberian-American film director, producer, screenwriter, editor and actress. Dunye's work often concerns themes of race, sexuality, and gender, particularly issues relating to black lesbians. She is known as the first out black lesbian to ever direct a feature film with her 1996 film The Watermelon Woman. She runs the production company Jingletown Films based in Oakland California.

Early life
Dunye was born in Monrovia, Liberia and grew up in Philadelphia, Pennsylvania. She first attended Michigan State University where she was in the political theory program due to her desire to make a change and have an impact on the world. When she realized she could use media as a tool in her political activism, she ended up in the filmmaking program at Temple University in Philadelphia. She received her BA from Temple and her MFA from Rutgers' Mason Gross School of Art. While at Temple University, Dunye made her first ever video project for her senior thesis which was a montage of images of things like newspapers that she had recorded and played over a reading of a poem by Sapphire called "Wild Thing."

Career

Academics 
She has taught at the University of California, Los Angeles, UC Santa Cruz, Pitzer College, Claremont Graduate University, Pomona College, California Institute of the Arts, The New School of Social Research, the School of the Art Institute of Chicago and San Francisco State University.

The Early Works of Cheryl Dunye 
Dunye began her career with six short films which have been collected on DVD as The Early Works of Cheryl Dunye. Most of these videos feature the use of mixed media, a blurring of fact and fiction and explored issues relating to the director's experience as a black lesbian filmmaker. These films are early examples of "Dunyementaries," a blend of narrative and documentary techniques that Dunye describes as "a mix of film, video, friends, and a lot of heart." These works, spanning from 1990-1994, explore themes of race, sexuality, family, relationships, whiteness, and the intricacies of white and black lesbian dating culture. Dunye's early works were produced with a low budget and often starred Dunye herself as lead actress.

Janine (1990) 
"(Experimental documentary, 1990) The story of a black lesbian's relationship with a white, upper middle class high school girl." This experimental documentary follows Dunye's narration of her friendship with a high school classmate, Janine Sorelli. Dunye describes her crush on Janine that spanned from 9th to 12th grade. Dunye explains that Janine's wealthy middle class lifestyle made Dunye feel out of place and uncomfortable with her own identity. Their relationship ended after their senior year of high school when, after Dunye came out to Janine as gay, Janine's mother offered to pay for a doctor to "talk to somebody about [her] problems." Later in life, Dunye called Janine to catch up, but ended the conversation after Janine criticized some of their old high school classmates for having children despite being unmarried.

Dunye describes her experience working on Janine as an external expression of her personal struggles. Dunye says, "The issues I raise in Janine aren't easy ones, and I struggle with them daily. Rather than internalizing them, I put them in my videos." As Dunye says when discussing Janine, she finds it important to represent herself in her work "physically and autobiographically," and states that her work has two goals: to educate audiences unfamiliar with black lesbians and their communities and to empower and entertain other black lesbians through representation in her films.

She Don't Fade (1991) 
"(Experimental narrative, 1991) A self-reflexive look at the sexuality of a young black lesbian."

This film follows the sexual pursuits of Shae Clarke, an African American lesbian. Clarke, played by Dunye, defines and readily demonstrates her "new approach to women."

Vanilla Sex (1992) 
"(Experimental documentary, 1992)."

This three-minute experimental documentary features Dunye's voice in conversation with an offscreen character, played over photography and found footage. Dunye's narration describes the different meanings of the term vanilla sex which, to white lesbians, meant sex without toys while, to black lesbians, meant sex with white women. Dunye uses the opportunity to explore and discuss the different meanings of such a term in two different contexts between the white and black lesbian communities.

An Untitled Portrait (1993) 
"(Video montage, 1993) Dunye's relationship with her brother is examined in this mixture of appropriated film footage, super 8mm home movies & Dunye's special brand of humor."

The Potluck and the Passion (1993) 
"(Experimental narrative, 1993) Sparks fly as racial, sexual and social politics intermingle at a lesbian potluck."

Greetings from Africa (1994) 
"(Narrative, 1994) Cheryl, playing herself, humorously experiences the mysteries of lesbian dating in the 90s."

Greetings From Africa (1994) is a narrative short film featuring Dunye as Cheryl, a young adult black lesbian working to navigate the complicated world of lesbian dating in the 90s. The film opens with Cheryl narrating in front of a camera about her efforts to get back into the dating scene while attempting to avoid the common pitfall of lesbian serial monogamy. After this opening, Cheryl meets L, a white woman, at a party. L and Cheryl hit it off, and soon meet for a date. Before their date, Cheryl and a friend discuss L, mentioning that Cheryl's friend knew someone had recently seen L at the African American studies department office at a nearby school. Later, after Cheryl has not heard from L for a few days, she attends a party hoping to see L there. Cheryl strikes up a conversation with another black queer woman at the party. Cheryl is surprised to find the woman is not L's old roommate, as L had told Cheryl, but rather her girlfriend. The film concludes with Cheryl reading a greeting card from L with the tagline, "Greetings from Africa." The postcard reads that L has joined the Peace Corps and was currently living and working on the Ivory Coast in Africa.

This film explores themes of black fetishization as L is depicted to have had multiple relationships with black women, also implied by her presence at the African American Studies Department and her final postcard labelled, "Greetings From Africa."

The Watermelon Woman (1996) 

Her feature film debut was The Watermelon Woman (1996), an exploration of the history of black women and lesbians in film. "[It] has earned a place in cinematic history as the first feature-length narrative film written and directed by out black lesbian about black lesbians." In 1993 Dunye was doing research for a class on black film history, by looking for information on black actresses in early films. Many times the credits for these women were left out of the film. Frustrated by a lack in the archives, Dunye created a fictional character, Fae Richards, and constructed an archive for that character. Thus, Dunye utilized fiction and the arts to address gaps she noted in official knowledge records. Dunye decided that she was going to use her work to create a story for black women in early films. The film's title is a play on the Melvin Van Peebles's film The Watermelon Man (1970). Dunye then used the creative archival material to curate events to raise funds and show progress to donors.

In the film, the protagonist Cheryl, played by the director, is an aspiring black lesbian filmmaker attempting to bring about the history of black lesbians in cinematic history while attempting to produce her own work because "our stories have never been told." Cheryl the protagonist becomes fascinated by an actress she finds in a movie called Plantation Memories and decides she wants to learn everything there is to know about the actress listed only as "Watermelon Woman" in the credits of the film. The story explores the difficulty in navigating archival sources that either excludes or ignores black queer women working in Hollywood, particularly that of actress Fae Richards whose character bore the name that provides the title for the film.

In 2016, the film was restored and rereleased widely for its 20th anniversary and resides in the permanent cinema collection at the Museum of Modern Art in New York City.

Stranger Inside (2001) 
Dunye's second feature is the HBO produced television movie Stranger Inside based on the experiences of African-American lesbians in prison. The film had a budget of $2 million and was released in theaters as well as on their network.

The film deals with a young woman and juvenile offender named Treasure (Yolanda Ross), who seeks to build a relationship with her estranged mother by getting transferred to the same prison facility once she becomes an adult.

Dunye became interested in exploring motherhood within imprisonment in Stranger Inside by the birth of her daughter and Harriet Jacobs's Incidents in the Life of a Slave Girl. Additionally, Dunye was interested in the topic of incarcerated women through Angela Davis's work and the Critical Resistance's Creating Change conference at University of California, Berkeley. In a 2004 issue of Feminist Studies, Dunye discussed some of her inspiration and purpose for the film, particularly how these women make prison a home. "In approaching this piece," Dunye says, "I was interested in how connected a lot of these women are to the outside world and how they find that balance to being an inmate, being a mother, being a member of a family or a clan, or a group that got them in--one that they support or have to support. It puts these women in many different spaces at the same time. But one space that they have to call home is this institution: the prison." Dunye did extensive research into women's prisons and extended this research process to the cast and crew during preproduction, like visiting actual women's prisons. Dunye conducted a screenwriting workshop modeled after Rhodessa Jones's Medea Project: Theater for Incarcerated Women during her research. The workshop consisted of Dunye working with 12 incarcerated women from the Shakopee Correctional Facility in Minnesota; this partnership was commissioned through the Walker Art Center during Dunye's time as the center's Artist in Residence. Dunye looked to understand the interpersonal relationships in prison and their use as a means of survival. The collaborative project of the script was then performed in live readings by the twelve workshop participants and presented at the prison. By the time of the release of the film, seven of these women were released and were able to attend a screening at the Walker Center. Those that had not yet completed their sentences were able to view the film at the Shakopee Women's Facility as the film was screened there as well. A live reading performed by professional actors was recorded by the Walker Centre and was showcased at festivals and contributed to the successful funding and production of the film.

Black is Blue (2014) 
Dunye's short film Black Is Blue (2014) screened at over 35 festivals, after great traction and funding from the Tribeca Film Institute. The short film tells the story of Black, an African American trans man, who works as a security guard inside an apartment complex in present day Oakland, California. On the night of a 'stud party,' Black is forced to confront his pre-transition past, struggling to make his outside match his inside.

Other works 
Taking a turn from self-written lesbian-focused films, she directed My Baby's Daddy starring Eddie Griffin, Michael Imperioli, and Anthony Anderson in 2004, although a character in the film turns out to be lesbian.

She directed The Owls, co-written with novelist Sarah Schulman, which made its debut at the Berlin International Film Festival. The film is about a group of "Older, Wiser Lesbians" (an acronym of which provides the title) who accidentally kill a younger woman and try to cover it up. The cast includes Guinevere Turner and V. S. Brodie, who had appeared together in the 1994 lesbian-themed film Go Fish and The Watermelon Woman, as well as Dunye, Lisa Gornick, Skyler Cooper, and Deak Evgenikos.

In 2010, Dunye's feature script Adventures in the 419, also co-written with Schulman, was selected as one of the works-in-progress films in the Tribeca All Access program during the 2010 Tribeca Film Festival. The film is set in Amsterdam and is about 419 scams among the immigrant community. A television adaptation of the film is currently in the works.

Her romantic comedy Mommy is Coming was nominated for Best Feature Film at the 2012 Berlin Film Festival.

She has expressed interest in adapting some literary works from Octavia Butler and Audre Lorde.

Television 
In 2017, Dunye had her TV directorial debut with Ava Duvernay's Queen Sugar "as part of Duvernay's initiative to create opportunities for female film directors to enter the field of Television." She directed two episodes in its second season and in 2019 she served as the Producing Director of season 4. Her other episodic directing credits include Claws (TNT), The Fosters (Freeform), Love Is (OWN), The Chi (Showtime), Star (FOX), Dear White People (Netflix), David Makes Man (OWN), All Rise (CBS), Delilah (OWN), Lovecraft Country (HBO), Y: The Last Man (FX), and The Umbrella Academy (Netflix). Her episode of Lovecraft Country "Strange Case" earned Dunye a 52nd NAACP Image Award Nomination for Outstanding Directing in a Drama Series.

In 2020 Dunye optioned the rights to the novel The Gilda Stories by Jewelle Gomez for which she will serve as writer and director for its television adaptation.

She is also working on developing the British novel Trumpet by Jackie Kay into a television series.

Influences 
Dunye cites numerous influences that have contributed to her work including that of Chantal Akerman, Woody Allen, Spike Lee, Godard but notes that Jim McBride's David Holzman's Diary (1967) and Charles Burnett's Killer of Sheep (1977) are some of the "most powerful" influences on her.

Her first video, Wild Thing, was an experimental adaptation of the live reading by the black lesbian author and poet Sapphire. Some of the other literary figures that Dunye recalls include Harriet Jacobs, Toni Morrison, Audre Lorde and Fannie Hurst. Notably she has remarked that her work often brings to mind, American experimental filmmaker Barbara Hammer. In terms of style and documentary filmmaking, she says that some of the most influential films for her are the works of Michelle Parkerson including her documentary about Audre Lorde and her film Stormé: The Lady of the Jewel Box. For Stranger Inside, Dunye has said that both the adaptations and the novel Imitation of Life played a major part in the mood of the film.

Style 
"Dunye has described her early films and videos as 'dunyementaries', works in which she integrates 'documentary and fiction,'" but this style is present in most of her following work as well. In The Watermelon Woman, personal archival materials are the essential pieces that form the history that the protagonist is searching to discover. Photographs, both authentic images from the 1930s and 1940s and recreations made by the director of photography Zoë Leonard, were used in the film and play an important part in the construction of the history that the protagonist seeks.

In Stranger Inside, Dunye mixes documentary and fiction, as some of the background actors were actual former inmates. The film was first conceived as a documentary feature, and it employs documentary techniques, but Dunye felt that a narrative approach would better suit the subject matter.

Personal life
Dunye is a lesbian. She has two children. As of 2012, she resides with her spouse in Oakland, California. In 2018, Dunye created her production company, Jingletown Films, named after the neighborhood of Jingletown in Oakland that she once lived in. According to the company's website, its goal is to provide a platform for storytellers and filmmakers that are people of color and/or queer and to be a space for diverse artists to thrive and have their voices heard.

Filmography

Director
 Janine (1990)
10 minutes, Videotape, Experimental Documentary
 She Don't Fade (1991)
24 minutes, Videotape, Experimental Documentary
 Vanilla Sex (1992)
4 minute, Videotape, Video Montage
 An Untitled Portrait (1993)
3.5 minute, Videotape, Video Montage
 The Potluck and the Passion (1993)
22 minute, Videotape, Experimental Narrative
 Greetings from Africa (1994)
8 minutes, 16mm, b&w, color, sound
 The Watermelon Woman (1996)
85 minutes, color, Narrative Feature
 Stranger Inside (2001) (TV)
97 minutes, TV movie
 My Baby's Daddy (2004)
86 minutes, Narrative Feature
 The Owls (2010)
66 minutes, Thriller
Mommy is Coming (2012)
64 minutes, Romantic Comedy
 Black Is Blue (2014)
21 minutes, Short
 Queen Sugar (2017–19) (TV)
 "To Usward" (S2)
 "Fruit of the Flower" (S2)
 "Pleasure is Black" (S4)
 "Oh Mamere" (S4)
The Fosters (2018) (TV)
 "Line in the Sand" (S5)
 Claws (2018–21) (TV)
 "Russian Navy" (S2)
 "Chapter Two: Vengeance" (S4)
 Love Is (2018) (TV)
 "(His) Answers" (S1)
 Star (2018) (TV)
 "All Falls Down" (S3)
 The Chi (2019) (TV)
 "A Leg Up" (S2)
 The Village (2019) (TV)
 "I Have Got You" (S1)
Dear White People (2019) (TV)
"Volume 3: Chapter V" (S3)
 David Makes Man (2019) (TV)
 "Bubble House" (S1)
 "Some I Love Who Are Dead" (S1)
 "3 Sons' Sky" (S1)
Sacred Lies (2020) (TV)
"Chapter Nine: Bloodline" (S2)
"Chapter Ten: With the Dancing Lions" (S2)
Lovecraft Country (2020) (TV)
 "Strange Case" (S1)
 All Rise (2019–21) (TV)
 "How to Succeed in Law Without Really Re-Trying" (S1)
 "Merrily We Ride Along" (S1)
"Bette Davis Eyes" (S2)
 Delliah (2021) (TV)
 "Everything to Everybody" (S1)
 "Toldja" (S1)
Pride (2021) (TV)
"1970s: The Vanguard of Struggle" (S1)
 Y: The Last Man (2021) (TV)
 "Peppers" (S1)
 Bridgerton (2022) (TV)
 "Harmony" (S2)
 "The Viscount Who Loved Me" (S2)
 The Umbrella Academy (2022) (TV)
 "World’s Biggest Ball of Twine" (S3)
 "Pocket Full of Lightning" (S3)
 American Gigolo (2022) (TV)
 "Atomic" (S1)
 The Rookie: Feds (2022) (TV)
 "The Reaper" (S1)
 The Equalizer (2022) (TV)
 "Blowback" (S3)

Actress
 She Don't Fade (1991) "Shae Clark"
 The Watermelon Woman (1996) "Cheryl"
 The New Women (2000) "Phaedra"
The Owls (2010) "Carol"
Mommy is Coming (2012) "Cabby"
Dropping Penny (2018) "Alpha Donna"

Editor
She Don't Fade (1991)
Vanilla Sex (1992)
The Watermelon Woman (1996)

Writer
She Don't Fade (1991)
The Watermelon Woman (1996)
Stranger Inside (2001)
Turnaround (2002)
The Owls (2010)
Mommy is Coming (2012)
Black is Blue (2014)
Brother from Another Time (2014)

Awards
 1991: Fine Cut Winner Independent Images: TV 12 WHYY Inc.
 1995: Artist Mentor Residency Award Film Video Arts Inc.
 1995: Media Production Award; National Endowment for the Arts
 1995: Vito Russo Filmmaker Award; New York Lesbian, Gay, Bisexual, & Transgender Film Festival
 1995: Ursula Award; Hamburg Lesbian & Gay Film Festival
 1996: Audience Award at LA Outfest for Outstanding narrative feature - The Watermelon Woman
 1996: Teddy Award at the Berlin International Film Festival for Best feature film - The Watermelon Woman
 1996: Audience Award Créteil International Women's Film Festival
 1996: Audience Award; Torino International Gay & Lesbian Film Festival
 1997: Biennial Anonymous Was A Woman Award; Whitney Museum of American Art
 1998: The Rockefeller Foundation Award; The Rockefeller Foundation
 2000: Best Director Award; Girlfriends
 2001: Audience Award at LA Outfest
 2001: Audience Award from the Philadelphia Film Festival, and the Audience Award from the San Francisco International Film Festival.
 2001: Special Jury Award from the Miami Gay and Lesbian Film Festival - Stranger Inside
 2001: Audience Award for best narrative feature - Stranger Inside
 2002: Audience Award and Special Mention at the Créteil International Women's Film Festival for Stranger Inside
 2002: London International Lesbian and Gay Film Festival; Best Feature Award
 2002: Lifetime Achievement Award Girlfriends 
 2004: Community Vision Award; National Center for Lesbian Rights
 2016: The Guggenheim Fellowship Award; John Simon Guggenheim Memorial Foundation
2020: Outstanding Directing in a Comedy Series; Black Reel Awards for Television - Dear White People
2022: Cinema Eye Legacy Award - The Watermelon Woman

See also 
 List of female film and television directors
 List of lesbian filmmakers
 List of LGBT films directed by women

References

Further reading
 
 Kumbier, Alana (2014). Ephemeral Material: Queering the Archive. 
 Mauceri, Marc (1997). Lavender Limelight: Lesbians in Film.
 Interview with Dunye (Chapter 18 of a book)

External links
 Official site
 
 Video Interview  with Cheryl Dunye at QFest 2010
 Cheryl Dunye at the California College of the Arts

1966 births
Living people
20th-century American actresses
21st-century American actresses
20th-century Liberian women
21st-century Liberian women
20th-century Liberian people
21st-century Liberian people
African-American actresses
African-American film directors
American film actresses
American film directors
American women film directors
Lesbian academics
American lesbian actresses
American lesbian artists
LGBT film directors
Liberian film actresses
Liberian film directors
Liberian women film directors
LGBT African Americans
Liberian emigrants to the United States
Liberian LGBT people
LGBT people from Pennsylvania
American women television directors
American television directors
20th-century African-American women
20th-century African-American people
21st-century African-American women
21st-century American LGBT people
Pomona College faculty